Love and Anarchy is a 1973 Italian film directed by Lina Wertmüller and starring Giancarlo Giannini and Mariangela Melato. The story, set in Fascist Italy before the outbreak of World War II, centers on Giannini's character, an anarchist who stays in a brothel while preparing to assassinate Benito Mussolini. Giannini's character falls in love with one of the women working in the brothel. This film explores the depths of his emotions concerning love, his hate for fascism, and his fears of being killed while assassinating Mussolini.

Love and Anarchy was nominated for the Palme d'Or at the 1973 Cannes Film Festival and Giannini was awarded Best Actor.

Plot
The film begins with Tunin (Giancarlo Giannini) learning that his friend, an anarchist who was plotting to kill Benito Mussolini, has been killed by Mussolini's fascist police in the countryside. Tunin decides to take up the cause his friend died for. The movie then shows Tunin entering a brothel in Rome and meeting Salomè (Mariangela Melato), and the two have a casual sexual encounter. Salomè explains her reasons for helping in the assassination plot as her former lover was wrongfully beaten to death by Mussolini's police in Milan. The story continues as Salomè arranges for her, Tunin and Tripolina (Lina Polito), another prostitute at the brothel, to spend the day with Spatoletti (Eros Pagni), the head of Mussolini's police. The four of them go to the countryside near Rome where the assassination will take place in a few days' time. Salomè keeps Spatoletti busy while Tunin scouts out the area and makes a plan. Tunin takes an interest, however, in Tripolina, and they fall in love. Tunin convinces Tripolina to spend the next two days with him before the assassination as he fears they may be his last. On the morning of the assassination, Tripolina is supposed to wake Tunin early. She loves him and is scared he will die so she decides she will not wake him. Tripolina and Salomè argue about this and what to do but in the end they decide to let him sleep. Tunin wakes up and is furious at both of them, and he goes into a tirade that draws the attention of the police. He starts a shootout with them and screams that he wants to kill Mussolini. He is captured and beaten to death by the police. The film ends the way it began showing the full title of the film "Stamattina alle 10, in via dei Fiori, nella nota casa di tolleranza..." This morning at 10, on Via dei Fiori (Flowers Street), in a noted brothel which is the headline of an unnamed newspaper. The article, displaying fascist censorship, states that Tunin (who is unnamed) was arrested and then killed himself.

Cast
 Giancarlo Giannini as Antonio Soffiantini 'Tunin'
 Mariangela Melato as Salomè
 Lina Polito as Tripolina
 Eros Pagni as Giacinto Spatoletti
 Pina Cei as Madame Aida
 Elena Fiore as Donna Carmela
 Giuliana Calandra
 Isa Bellini as Zoraide
 Isa Danieli as Prostitute
 Enrica Bonaccorti as Prostitute
 Anna Bonaiuto as Prostitute
 Anita Branzanti as Prostitute
 Maria Sciacca as Prostitute
 Anna Melato as Prostitute
 Gea Linchi as Prostitute
 Anna Stivala as Prostitute
 Roberto Herlitzka as Paulasso

Production notes
Giancarlo Giannini starred in three other films Wertmuller made during this period: The Seduction of Mimi, Swept Away, and Seven Beauties.

English version
For the initial American release, editor Fima Noveck created a prologue which featured a montage of photos of Mussolini, along with a crawl explaining his rise to power and the violent activities sanctioned in his name during his reign. Also, in this edit, the full Italian title is not displayed, in favor of the abbreviated English title Love and Anarchy.

References

Further reading

External links 
 

1973 films
Films scored by Nino Rota
Films scored by Carlo Savina
1970s Italian-language films
1970s political comedy-drama films
Italian political comedy-drama films
Films set in the 1930s
Films set in Italy
Films set in Rome
Films about anarchism
Films directed by Lina Wertmüller
1973 comedy films
1973 drama films
1970s Italian films